Crataegus collina is a type of hawthorn that is closely related to C. punctata, the dotted hawthorn, and sometimes considered to be the same species. A sample of C. collina and C. punctata  has suggested that C. collina is polyploid, and C. punctata is diploid, but a wider sample is needed to confirm that this is generally the case.

References

collina
Flora of the United States
Taxa named by Alvan Wentworth Chapman